Sir Thomas Gerard (died 1416), of Ashton-in-Makerfield, Lancashire and Kingsley, Cheshire, was an English politician.

He was a Member (MP) of the Parliament of England for Lancashire in April 1384, February 1388 and 1394.

References

14th-century births
1416 deaths
English MPs April 1384
People from Ashton-in-Makerfield
People from Cheshire
English MPs February 1388
English MPs 1394
Members of the Parliament of England (pre-1707) for Lancashire